Amojjar Pass is a mountain pass in the Adrar Plateau in the centre of Adrar, near Atar, Mauritania. The pink-brown sandstone of the pass was worn away by repeated cycles of extreme dryness interrupted by torrential rain. The bases of the steep valley walls are covered in scree, loosed by the erosion of the rainfall. There is little plant life in the pass. Acacias are a notable exception, as they are resistant to drought.

Amojjar Pass is an important link for ground transportation in Mauritania because it provides a somewhat protected roadway connecting Mauritania's capital, Nouakchott, with other important locations such as Ouadane and Chinguetti.

Gallery

References

External links
 A NASA satellite image

Mountain passes of Mauritania
Canyons and gorges of Africa
Adrar Region